Uzoegbu Chukwuemeka Alexander, better known by the stage name Naya Dane is a Nigerian musician and song writer.

Biography 
Uzoegbu Chukwuemeka Alexander who was born and raised in the Okokomaiko area of Lagos state. He began singing and making music as a child under the nickname "Lil Slizzy".

He released his first official single "Diana" in 2016. He later released the single "Badder" under the stage name Naya Dane.

In 2016, he signed a one year management deal with Rockwell360.

In recent years, Dane has entered the NFT world & has dropped a collection entitled “Official Naya Dane” on OpenSea.

References 
  

1995 births
Nigerian singer-songwriters
Afro pop musical groups
Living people
People from Lagos State